Richard "Handsome Dick" Manitoba (born Richard Blum; January 29, 1954) is an American punk rock singer and radio personality, best known as the original lead singer of New York City-based band The Dictators and the reunion singer of MC5.

Background
Manitoba is Jewish, and was born in the Bronx, New York City, in 1954. He started out his singing career as a roadie for The Dictators. He made his official stage debut with The Dictators at Popeye's Spinach Factory in Sheepshead Bay, Brooklyn, in 1975.

The band's first major-label album, The Dictators Go Girl Crazy! (Epic Records, 1975), featured his picture on the cover and he was listed as the "Secret Weapon". While he sang some lead and some background, he was still considered a "mascot" of the band. He took on a larger singing role on The Dictators' second offering, Manifest Destiny, a 1977 release on the Asylum label. On Bloodbrothers, the third and final Dictators studio recording from the 1970s (also on Asylum, 1978), Manitoba sang lead vocals on most tracks. The Dictators disbanded in late 1981.

In 1986, Manitoba, along with other former members of the Dictators, formed Wild Kingdom. In 1989, the band rebranded itself to Manitoba's Wild Kingdom and, in 1990, released an album ...And You? on MCA Records.

The Dictators reformed in 1991.

Career

In 2004, Manitoba threatened to sue independent electronic musician Dan Snaith for using the band name "Manitoba". Snaith changed his musical name to Caribou.

Manitoba appeared in the 2004 documentary Kiss Loves You.

In 2004, Manitoba began hosting "The Handsome Dick Manitoba Radio Program" in Little Steven Van Zandt's Underground Garage channel, on Sirius XM Radio. In 2005 the Village Voice awarded him "Best Satellite Radio DJ". Manitoba's gig on the Underground Garage continued for 14 years. Soon after the program was terminated, Manitoba moved on to other projects.

In 2005, Manitoba joined the reformed MC5 on vocals, replacing original singer Rob Tyner, who died in 1991. The band split up with the death of bassist Michael Davis in 2012.

In 2007, Manitoba co-authored The Official Punk Rock Book of Lists with Amy Wallace.

A re-formed Manitoba's Wild Kingdom played at the 2008 Joey Ramone Birthday Bash.

In January 2012 the band Manitoba, featuring Manitoba, Ross the Boss, Dean Rispler (ex-Murphys Law), JP Paterson, and Daniel Rey, was formed to play the Light of the Day Festival in Asbury park, a benefit for medical charities. After a handful of shows, in September 2012, the band toured Europe. In April 2013, the band name was rebranded to The Dictators NYC. Further tours of the US and Europe followed in subsequent years.

A single, "Supply and Demand", composed by Boss, Manitoba, and Manitoba's son Jake, and backed with a live version of the MC5's "Kick Out the Jams", was released in November 2015. In July 2017, it was announced that the band name would be changed back to Manitoba, "due to legal threats by ex-bandmates, Andy Shernoff and Scott Kempner".

Manitoba's first solo album, Born in the Bronx, was released November 2019, on Liberation Records, distributed by MVD.

Manitoba owned and ran a bar for over 20 years. Manitoba's opened January 14, 1999 in the East Village, Manhattan in New York City and closed June 25, 2019.

Manitoba pleaded guilty to disorderly conduct, in New York State on May 3, 2018 after an incident with his then-girlfriend, Zoe Hansen.

In February 2019, Manitoba started his own podcast, You don’t know Dick. He also has a YouTube channel.

References

External links

Manitoba's A bar operated by Manitoba.
"Punk, and Jewish: Rockers Explore Identity" 2009 New York Times article.

Living people
1954 births
American punk rock singers
MC5 members
People from the Bronx
Singers from New York City
Jewish American musicians
Jews in punk rock
The Dictators members
21st-century American Jews